William Stormont (25 August 1898 – 4 June 1925) was a New Zealand rugby league player who represented New Zealand. His parents were John Stormont (1 Aug 1863 – 23 September 1936), a pastry chef and baker, and Annie Stormont nee Brownlie (7 July 1871 – 7 Dec 1944).

Playing career
Stormont played for Marist in the Auckland Rugby League competition. He represented Auckland and was first selected for the New Zealand national rugby league team in 1920 following Aucklands 24-16 win over the touring English team. Stormont was the first member of the Marist club to be selected for the Kiwis. He played in all 3 tests in the #10 prop position against the touring England team in 1920. New Zealand lost the 3 matches 7-31 at the Auckland Domain, 3-19 at Lancaster Park, and 10-11 at the Basin Reserve. Film of Stormont playing for Auckland against the 1924 touring English team can be seen at the Ngā Taonga Sound and vision archive.

Military career
Stormont enlisted in the New Zealand Defence Force on 11 May 1917 aged 18 using a false birthdate (25/4/1897). At the time, recruits were required to be 19 to be posted overseas. He was meant to travel on ship 93, the Corinthic, but was AWOL at departure. His war record contains details of his court marshal and disciplinary record. He retrained as a Machine Gunner and traveled to the United Kingdom on 31 December 1917 on ship 99, the Athenic. He was hospitalized on arrival with Influenza for 5 days in early April 1918 and did not travel to France until June 1918. His war record also lists hospitalization for bunions in December 1918.

Later Years and Death
He returned to play rugby league for Marist in 1920, later becoming the club captain. Stormont died from rheumatic heart disease on June 4, 1925 after a long battle with illness aged 26. The William Stormont Memorial Shield was presented to the Auckland Rugby League by the Stormont family. That same year, Ponsonby defeated City 35-3 to become the first holder of the Stormont Shield.

References

New Zealand rugby league players
New Zealand national rugby league team players
Auckland rugby league team players
Marist Saints players
Rugby league props
New Zealand military personnel of World War I
1898 births
1925 deaths